Callum McLelland (born 16 September 1999) is a Scotland international rugby league footballer who plays as a  or  for the Castleford Tigers in the Super League.

He has spent time on loan from Leeds at Featherstone Rovers in the Betfred Championship.

Background
McLelland was born in Pontefract, West Yorkshire, England. He is known to be a huge Pokémon collector dating his collections back to 2005 including a PSA 10 Charizard.   

Callum's youth career saw him play for his local team Castleford Lock Lane for a number of years before being picked up by the Castleford Tigers Academy.

Playing career

Leeds Rhinos
In 2019 Mclelland Crossed codes from Rugby Union and signed for the Leeds Rhinos on a three and a half year contract. He made professional debut for Leeds against Workington Town in the Challenge Cup. Mclelland made a handful of appearances for the Rhinos impressing on multiple occasions catching the eye of the Scotland Coaches.

Castleford Tigers
McLelland joined the Castleford Tigers on 11 October 2021 on a 2-year deal with an option of a further 2 years

References

External links
Leeds Rhinos profile
SL profile
Mclelland rejoins Tigers

1999 births
Living people
Castleford Tigers players
English people of Scottish descent
English rugby league players
Featherstone Rovers players
Leeds Rhinos players
Rugby league five-eighths
Rugby league players from Pontefract
Scotland national rugby league team players